Of the Farm is a 1965 novel by the American author John Updike. Of the Farm was his fourth novel.  The story concerns Joey Robinson, a divorced, thirty-five-year-old Manhattan advertising executive who visits his mother on her unfarmed farm in rural Pennsylvania.  He has come with his new wife, Peggy and her son, Richard, a precocious eleven-year-old.  The novel explores both Joey's relationship to his widowed mother, a flinty woman who reveres her farm, and to Peggy, a kind, sensual woman.  Joey feels guilt for leaving his mother, and anger at her stubborn refusal to leave the farm, and anger at her from having uprooted his late father from the suburbs to move to the farm decades ago.  Joey is buffeted by doubt, angst, and anger, and is pinballed between his dueling mother and Peggy.

References 

1965 American novels
Novels by John Updike
Alfred A. Knopf books
Novels set in Pennsylvania